Thermal and a Quarter (often abbreviated as TAAQ) are a rock band from Bangalore, India. Formed in 1996, they describe their music as "Bangalore rock" - rooted in a classic rock idiom while Indian in "subtle, inescapable ways". TAAQ had released seven studio albums by their 20th anniversary in 2016 with an eighth released in 2020.

Show openers
TAAQ opened the show for Deep Purple in 2001, when they performed in Bangalore. The band also opened for Guns N' Roses in 2012.

Band members
The current members of TAAQ are:
 Bruce Lee Mani (guitar and vocals)
 Rajeev Rajagopal (drums)
 Leslie Charles (bass) and 
 Tony Das (guitar).

Discography
The albums released by the band included
 Thermal and a Quarter (2000)
 Jupiter Café (2002)
 Plan B (2005)
 This Is It (2008)
 3 Wheels 9 Lives (2012)
 The Scene (2015)
 No Wall Too High (2015)
 A World Gone Mad (2020)

Awards & honours
TAAQ was featured on The WorldSpace Honours 2007 for their outstanding contributions to Indian rock scene with interviews with other Indian band members, an extensive play-through of their work by RJ Hari, and an Interview with the band themselves about "10 years of TAAQ".

Mani won Guitarist of the Year at the Jack Daniels Rock Awards in 2009 and 2012. He also won the "Leon Ireland Outstanding Vocalist Award" at JRO 2011.

Music School
In 2010, TAAQ opened a music school in Koramangala, Bangalore, called the "Taaqademy". A branch in Whitefield was opened in 2014.

References

External Links
 Thermal And A Quarter Official Site
 TAAQ Bandcamp
 Taaqademy

Indian rock music groups
Musicians from Bangalore
Musicians from Karnataka